Stefan Frankowski (3 April 1887, in Volhynia – 25 September 1940, in Bielawa) was a Polish commodore, posthumously promoted to counteradmiral. An officer of surface naval ships, from 1908 to 1917 he served in the Russian Imperial Navy and participated in the First World War. Later he joined the Polish Navy and commanded a squadron of torpedo boats, was the commander of the Polish Navy NCO School, and was chief of Director Staff of Polish Navy. During the Invasion of Poland of 1939 he was a commander of Naval Coast Defence. Taken prisoner of war by the Germans, he died in captivity in 1940.

Honours and awards
Gold Cross of the Order of Virtuti Militari (posthumously)
Officer's Cross of the Order of Polonia Restituta (1930)
Cross of Valour
Gold Cross of Merit
Officer of the Legion of Honour (France)

References
Waldemar Strzałkowski: Życiorysy dowódców jednostek polskich w wojnie obronnej 1939 r., Stefan Frankowski (1887-1940) [in]: Jurga Tadeusz, Obrona Polski 1939, Instytut Wydawniczy PAX, Warszawa 1990,  ISBN 83-211-1096-7, p. 766-777,

Polish military personnel of World War II
World War II prisoners of war held by Germany
Polish Navy admirals
1887 births
1940 deaths
Polish prisoners of war
Officers of the Order of Polonia Restituta
Recipients of the Gold Cross of the Virtuti Militari
Recipients of the Cross of Valour (Poland)
Recipients of the Gold Cross of Merit (Poland)
Officiers of the Légion d'honneur

Polish military attachés